Wooster, formerly known as Kosciusko, is an unincorporated community in Washington Township, Kosciusko County, in the U.S. state of Indiana.

History
A post office was established at Wooster in 1854, and remained in operation until it was discontinued in 1903.

Geography

References

Unincorporated communities in Kosciusko County, Indiana
Unincorporated communities in Indiana